The open Beneteau First Class 7.5 competition at the 2006 Asian Games in Doha was held from 6 to 13 December 2006. The competition was Match race format. It consisted of a round-robin a semi-finals and final series. The top four crews from the round-robin were seeded into the semifinal.

Schedule
All times are Arabia Standard Time (UTC+03:00)

Squads

Results

Preliminary round

Knockout round

References

Results

External links
Official website

Open match racing